Scelotes vestigifer, the coastal dwarf burrowing skink, is a species of lizard which is endemic to South Africa.

References

vestigifer
Reptiles of South Africa
Reptiles described in 1994
Taxa named by Donald George Broadley